Lyubov Trokhymivna Mala (13 January 1919 – 14 April 2003) was a Soviet and Ukrainian therapist, Doctor of Medical Sciences, full member of the USSR Academy of Medical Sciences. She was the first female recipient of title Hero of Ukraine.

External links
Lyubov Trokhymivna Mala. Heroes of Ukraine
Buzalo, V. Lyubov Trokhymivna Mala. Encyclopedia of History of Ukraine.

1919 births
2003 deaths
20th-century Ukrainian physicians
20th-century women physicians
Academicians of the USSR Academy of Medical Sciences
Academicians of the Russian Academy of Medical Sciences
Heroes of Socialist Labour
Members of the National Academy of Sciences of Ukraine
People from Zaporizhzhia Oblast
People from Yekaterinoslav Governorate
Recipients of the Order of Prince Yaroslav the Wise, 5th class
Recipients of the Order of Bohdan Khmelnytsky, 3rd class
Recipients of the Order of Lenin
Recipients of the USSR State Prize
Recipients of the Order of State
Recipients of the title of Hero of Ukraine
Soviet women physicians
Soviet cardiologists
Ukrainian women physicians
Ukrainian cardiologists
Women cardiologists
Laureates of the State Prize of Ukraine in Science and Technology